The 2014–15 Gamma Ethniki Cup was the second edition of the Gamma Ethniki Cup, a Greek football Cup competition, wherein only the clubs of the Football League 2 (the third tier of the Greek football league system) were allowed to participate. The Cup winner competed at the end of the season with the winner of the 2014–15 Amateurs' Cup for the 2015 Amateurs' Super Cup.

First round
In first round of the competition, the clubs in each Group competed against each other in single matches (overtime and penalties applied) until two clubs were declared Group winners. The competing pairs were selected as a result of random drawing that took place on 5 September 2014. The match days of the First Round were set on 28 September 2014 for Match-Day 1, 26 October 2014 for Match-Day 2 and 10 December 2014 for Match-Day 3.

Group 1

Match-day 1
 	

|}

Match-day 2

|}

Match-day 3

|}

Group 2

Match-day 1

|}

Match-day 2

|}

Match-day 3

|}

Group 3

Match-day 1

|}
Aiolikos passed without game to Match-day 2

Match-day 2

|}

Match-day 3

|}

Group 4

Match-day 1

|}

Match-day 2

|}

Atromitos Piraeus passed without game to Match-day 3

Match-day 3

|}

Bracket

Quarter-finals
In the Second Round of the competition (Quarter-finals), the 8 Group winners competed against each other in single knock-out matches at the home ground of the club favored by the draw. All matches were held on 14 January 2015.

Semi-finals
In the Third Round of the competition (Semi-finals), the four clubs advancing from the Quarter-finals competed in single knockout matches at the home ground of the club favored by the draw. The two winners advanced to the final. Both matches were held on 25 February 2015.

Final

External links
Football League 2 Cup

2015
2014–15 in Greek football